Tiny Troopers: Joint Ops is a twin-stick shooter video game for PlayStation 3, PlayStation 4, PlayStation Vita, and Xbox One. Based on mobile and PC games originally developed by Kukouri Mobile Entertainment, Tiny Troopers: Joint Ops was ported by Plunge Interactive for Sony consoles and by Epiphany Games for the Xbox One, and published by Wired Productions. It was released on November 18, 2014.

The player controls tiny troopers as they battle enemies around the world with special weapons, collect items, and declare victory.

Reception

Tiny Troopers: Joint Ops received mixed reviews from critics upon release. On Metacritic, the game holds scores of 64/100 for the PlayStation 3 version based on 4 reviews, 65/100 for the PlayStation 4 version based on 4 reviews, 60/100 for the PlayStation Vita version based on 5 reviews, and 62/100 for the Xbox One version based on 12 reviews.

References

External links 
 Official website

2014 video games
Indie video games
Twin-stick shooters
PlayStation 3 games
PlayStation 4 games
PlayStation Vita games
Video games developed in Australia
Video games developed in Spain
Video games with isometric graphics
War video games
Xbox One games
Wired Productions games